"In My Head" is a song by Norwegian band Madcon. The song was released in Norway on 4 February 2013 as the lead single from their sixth studio album Icon (2013). The song spent several weeks at number 1 on iTunes, peaked at number 2 on the VG Top 40 chart Norway, and has reached double platinum status. The song is produced by ELEMENT.

Music video
A music video to accompany the release of "In My Head" was first released onto YouTube on 5 February 2013 at a total length of four minutes and fifty-one seconds. The video was directed by Ray Kay.

Track listing

Chart performance

Release history

References

2013 singles
Madcon songs
Songs written by Hitesh Ceon
Songs written by Kim Ofstad
Sony Music singles
2013 songs